The brushtail possums are the members of the genus Trichosurus in the Phalangeridae, a family of marsupials. They are native to Australia (including Tasmania) and some small nearby islands. Unique among marsupials, they have shifted the hypaxial muscles from the epipubic to the pelvis, much like in placental muscles, meaning that their breathing cycle is more similar to the latter than to that of other non-eutherian mammals. In general, they are more terrestrially oriented than other possums, and in some ways might parallel primates.

The genus contains these species:
Northern brushtail possum, T. arnhemensis
Short-eared possum, T. caninus
Mountain brushtail possum, T. cunninghami
Coppery brushtail possum, T. johnstonii
Common brushtail possum, T. vulpecula

Gallery

References

Possums
Taxonomy articles created by Polbot